Todd Woodbridge and Mark Woodforde were the defending champions, but did not participate this year.

Andrew Kratzmann and Mark Kratzmann won the title, defeating Byron Black and Grant Connell 6–4, 6–3 in the final.

Seeds

  David Adams /  Byron Black (final)
  David Macpherson /  Laurie Warder (first round)
  Mike Bauer /  David Rikl (quarterfinals)
 N/A

Draw

Draw

References
Draw

Next Generation Adelaide International
1994 ATP Tour
1994 in Australian tennis